A counterstereotype is an idea or object that goes against a standardized mental picture that is held in common by members of a group and that represents an oversimplified opinion, prejudiced attitude, or uncritical judgment.  
Although counterstereotypes arise in opposition to stereotypes, they may eventually become stereotypes themselves if they are too popular.

An example is the character type called the magical negro; Spike Lee popularized this term deriding the archetype of the "super-duper magical negro" in 2001 while discussing films with students at Washington State University and at Yale University.

Examples
American popular literature in the 19th century contained stereotypical images of black people as grotesque and servile.  In protest, a counter-stereotype arose which showed black people as graceful and wise.
In the United States during the 1970s, in response to feminist criticism, advertising agencies chose to display counter-stereotypical images of women as sexually assertive and intellectual.
In comic books, when the superhero began in the 1930s, he was an invulnerable, unalterably benevolent figure.  However, a desire for increased dramatic potential led to a move away from this stereotypical character, until in the 1980s and 1990s, the counterstereotypical angst-ridden anti-hero had become so popular as to constitute a new stereotype.
Michael Moorcock's character Elric of Melniboné—a tormented, sickly albino sorcerer with a demonic sword and a sizeable evil streak—was intended to be the polar opposite of the typical fantasy heroes of the time, who were almost universally muscular, Conan-like figures. As in the above example, Elric's success was such that he inspired an explosion of similar characters in popular fiction.
Scott Adam's Dilbert featured the character Antina, created in response to allegations that Tina the Brittle Tech Writer was too stereotypical.  Antina was, of course, herself considered to be too stereotypical.
The noble savage myth, used by supporters or admirers of indigenous peoples, is the opposite of the usual stereotypes implied by the word "savage".
The bear subculture, composed of gay men who embrace a hypermasculine image, has made headway in countering the old stereotypes of campiness and effeminacy.
The Lazy Husband is a trope typically portraying a dysfunctional man, married but incapable of contributing equally to his partner's efforts in a relationship either practically or emotionally. This counterstereotype is used heavily in advertising but is also seen in cinema and in various TV series. It contrasts with the old-fashioned view of the husband as the breadwinner and of the man as the charming and chivalrous knight.

Social psychology
Social psychologists have found that people tend to react more negatively to counterstereotypical people than to stereotypical people.

See also
 Affirmative action
 Benevolent prejudice
 Overcompensation
 Political correctness
 Reverse discrimination
 Women are wonderful
 Xenocentrism

References

Stereotypes
Linguistic controversies